Strahinja Pavlović (born 24 May 2001) is a Serbian professional footballer who plays as a centre-back for Austrian Bundesliga club Red Bull Salzburg and the Serbia national team.

Club career

Partizan

2015–2018: Youth years 
Born in Šabac, Pavlović started out at local club Savacium. He officially joined the youth system of Partizan in the summer of 2015. In September 2018, Pavlović signed his first professional contract with the club, agreeing to a three-year deal. He was promoted to the first team by manager Zoran Mirković ahead of winter preparations for the second half of the season.

2018–19: First-team breakthrough 
On 23 February 2019, Pavlović made his competitive senior debut for the club in a 3–0 home league win over Proleter Novi Sad, playing the full 90 minutes and receiving a yellow card in the process. A week later, on 2 March of the same year, Pavlović played his first Eternal derby, and at the time of the match his age was 17 years and 282 days. As in the match of the previous round, Pavlović received a yellow card in that meeting as well. He quickly established himself in the team's starting lineup, collecting 15 official appearances and helping Partizan win the 2018–19 Serbian Cup.

2019–20: New contract and first goal 
At the beginning of the 2019–20 season, Pavlović confirmed himself as a first-team regular, forming a central defensive partnership with the experienced Bojan Ostojić. He was reportedly close to signing with Italian club Lazio near the end of the summer transfer window. However, the negotiations failed and Pavlović signed a new five-year contract with Partizan. He scored his first career goal in a controversial 2–1 home league loss to Voždovac on 6 October.

Monaco

2019–20: Transfer and Partizan loan 
On 18 December 2019, it was officially announced that Partizan and Monaco had agreed terms for the transfer of Pavlović over the forthcoming winter transfer window. Pavlović would remain on loan with Partizan until June 2020.

2020–21: Loan to Cercle Brugge 
Pavlović's debut for Monaco came on 20 December 2020, as he came on as a late-match substitute in a 1–0 away victory over Dijon. On 21 January 2021, he joined Cercle Brugge on loan until the end of the season, having seen limited game time at Monaco due to being the fifth-choice centre-back in Niko Kovač's team.

2021–22: Loan to Basel 
After making 11 appearances for Monaco in all competitions in the first half of the 2021–22 season, on 16 February 2022 Pavlović was loaned to Basel in Switzerland until the end of the season. Pavlović joined Basel's first team for their 2021–22 season under head coach Patrick Rahmen. He played his domestic league debut for the club in the home game in the St. Jakob-Park on 19 February 2022 as Basel won 3–0 against Lausanne-Sport. During his short loan period with the club, Pavlović played a total of 11 games for Basel without scoring a goal. 10 of these games were in the Nationalliga A and the other was a friendly game.

International career
Pavlović was capped for Serbia at under-17 and under-19 levels. He made his national under-21 team debut on 6 September 2019, playing the full 90 minutes in a 1–0 away loss against Russia in their 2021 UEFA European Under-21 Championship qualifier.

He made his senior team debut on 3 September 2020, when he started in an away 2020–21 UEFA Nations League game against Russia.

In November 2022, he was selected in Serbia's squad for the 2022 FIFA World Cup in Qatar. He played in all three group stage matches, against Brazil, Cameroon, and Switzerland. He scored a header goal in a group stage match match against Cameroon, on assist from Dušan Tadić. Serbia finished fourth in the group.

Career statistics

Club

International

Scores and results list Serbia's goal tally first, score column indicates score after each Pavlović goal.

Honours
Partizan
 Serbian Cup: 2018–19

Notes

References

External links
 
 

2001 births
Living people
Sportspeople from Šabac
Serbian footballers
Serbia international footballers
Serbia under-21 international footballers
Serbia youth international footballers
Association football defenders
FK Partizan players
FK Teleoptik players
AS Monaco FC players
Cercle Brugge K.S.V. players
FC Basel players
Serbian SuperLiga players
Ligue 1 players
Belgian Pro League players
Swiss Super League players
Serbian expatriate footballers
Expatriate footballers in Monaco
Expatriate footballers in Belgium
Expatriate footballers in Switzerland
Serbian expatriate sportspeople in Monaco
Serbian expatriate sportspeople in Belgium
Serbian expatriate sportspeople in Switzerland
2022 FIFA World Cup players